Gulf, Colorado and Santa Fe Railroad Passenger Station is located on 1501 Jones Street in Fort Worth, Texas. The depot was built by the Gulf, Colorado and Santa Fe Railroad (a subsidiary of the Atchison, Topeka and Santa Fe Railway) in 1900 and renovated in 1938. It was originally called the Fort Worth Union Depot. Other tenant railroads at the station were the Chicago, Rock Island and Gulf Railway (a subsidiary of Chicago, Rock Island and Pacific Railway or 'Rock Island'), the St. Louis–San Francisco Railway ('Frisco') and the Southern Pacific Railroad.

Noteworthy trains included, in the mid-1960s:
Atchison, Topeka and Santa Fe Railway:
Kansas Cityan (Chicago to Dallas)
Texas Chief (Chicago to Galveston)
Chicago, Rock Island and Pacific Railway:
Twin Star Rocket (Dallas to Minneapolis)

The station was added to the National Register of Historic Places in 1970. From 1971 to 2002, it was used as Fort Worth's Amtrak station. In 2002, it passed into private ownership, and became an 800-seat venue for weddings, corporate dinners, and other special events, under the name "Ashton Depot".

There was an additional Fort Worth station, hosted by the Texas & Pacific Railway on W. Lancaster Avenue, the T&P Station.

See also

National Register of Historic Places listings in Tarrant County, Texas
Recorded Texas Historic Landmarks in Tarrant County

References

External links
Amtrak: A Closer Look: Fort Worth Union Depot 

National Register of Historic Places in Fort Worth, Texas
Railway stations in the United States opened in 1900
Railway stations closed in 2002
Railway stations on the National Register of Historic Places in Texas
Fort Worth
Fort Worth
Fort Worth
Fort Worth
1900 establishments in Texas
Railway stations in Fort Worth, Texas
Fort Worth, Texas